Highway 798 is a provincial highway in the Canadian province of Saskatchewan. It runs from Highway 684 to Saskatchewan Highway 17 on the Alberta border. Highway 798 is about 28 km (17 mi.) long.

Highway 798 passes near the town of Hillmond and also intersects Highway 675.

See also 
Roads in Saskatchewan
Transportation in Saskatchewan

References 

798